Eastlake is an unincorporated community and a U.S. Post Office in Adams County, Colorado, United States.  The Eastlake Post Office has the ZIP Code 80614.  Most of the Eastlake area has been annexed by the City of Thornton.

A post office called Eastlake has been in operation since 1912. The community takes its name from nearby East Lake.

The N Line (RTD) ends at Eastlake.

Geography
Eastlake is located at  (39.921323,-104.959259).

References

External links
 City of Thornton
 History of Eastlake

Unincorporated communities in Adams County, Colorado
Unincorporated communities in Colorado
Denver metropolitan area